Sagalee is a town in the Indian state of Arunachal Pradesh. Papum Pare is the name of the district that contains village Sagalee.

Sagalee is located 25 km towards West from District headquarters, Yupia.
It is one of the 60 constituencies of Legislative Assembly of Arunachal Pradesh. As of 23 May 2019, the MLA of this constituency is Nabam Tuki, who is a former Chief Minister of Arunachal Pradesh.

See also
List of constituencies of Arunachal Pradesh Legislative Assembly
Arunachal Pradesh Legislative Assembly

References

Villages in Papum Pare district